The Dudesons are a Finnish entertainment group. They are best known for their TV shows and live performances, which are a combination of stunts and comedy. Their early TV shows were similar to Jackass. Starting their television career in the early 2000s, they gained international fame and had a show on the American television channel MTV in 2010. After The Dudesons in America, the group started to shift from the stunts to more multidimensional careers.

Background
The Dudesons consists of Jukka Hildén (b. 1980), Jarppi Leppälä (b. 1979), Jarno Laasala (b. 1979) and Hannu-Pekka "HP" Parviainen (b. 1981). All were from the town of Seinäjoki, where Hildén, Leppälä, and Laasala became close friends while attending elementary school together, where they later met Parviainen.

As teenagers, the four became quite interested in snowboarding, skateboarding and downhill mountain biking. In the early 1990s, when Laasala got his first video camera, the group began filming their activities which eventually led to further pranks and extreme stunts. They created and sold VHS tapes which were filmed and edited by Laasala and subsequently their reputation began to grow in Seinäjoki.

Original Finnish TV series
In January 2000, Jarno Laasala obtained a job as an editor for a small Finnish cable TV channel called MoonTV. Similar to the American show Jackass, he saw a possibility to make his own show out of all the stunts the Dudesons had filmed. After finishing high school, the Dudesons set up their own production company called Rabbit Films. The group immediately began shooting a self-financed pilot episode of their own show.

This pilot was finished in August 2000 and the channel immediately green lit the first season, titled as "Maailmankiertue" (Worldtour). The episodes began airing in January 2001, and the series became the most popular show on MoonTV. In September 2001, the Dudesons moved from MoonTV to a nationwide TV channel Nelonen. The 2nd season, called "Extreme Duudsonit, Maailmankiertue 2", was first screened in 2002, and the same year the Dudesons were also elected as The Media Persons of the Year by the readers of Finland's most popular youth magazine Suosikki. The 3rd (Maailmankiertue 3) and 4th seasons (Duudsoni Elämää) of Extreme Duudsonit ran respectively in 2003 and 2004.

Recurring stunts and segments on the English-language version of the Dudesons includes: the "Human Dartboard," playing pranks on "Mr. Hitler" and a vast array of other stunts with "absolute disregard for [their] own safety."

International career
In 2003, the Dudesons made a decision to start making English-language material in order to find international distribution. Their following series, Duudsoni Elämää, was shot both in Finnish and English. The material was then edited both into Finnish-language series, and English language series. The Finnish series ran in 2004, while the English series had its international debut at Australian Channel V in February 2006. The American debut was on SpikeTV on 6 July 2006.

Jarppi, Jukka, and Jarno can be seen on Bam Margera's Viva La Bam. Jarppi and Jukka can also be seen on Bam Margera Presents: Where the ♯$&% Is Santa? (2008) and Minghags (2009).

Jukka appeared on Tom Green Live! on 10 October 2006 as a special guest with Steve-O from Jackass.

By September 2007, the Dudesons Season 1 had been shown in 22 countries around the world, making it the most widespread Finnish TV-series of all time. The second season began in Australia on 20 May 2008 on Channel V.
By the year 2010, different Dudesons seasons have been seen in over 150 countries.

In 2008 the Dudesons introduced Paramore in the Los Premios MTV Latinoamérica 2008.

The Dudesons are also featured in the hit 2010 movie Jackass 3D, alongside Johnny Knoxville. All four Dudesons were seen on the red carpet at the Jackass 3D premiere. The Dudesons are also in the 2011 movie Jackass 3.5.

The Dudesons presented the best hip hop award for the 2010 MTV Europe Music Awards. 

The Dudesons also appeared as a guest in one episode of Loiter Squad in 2013.

Jarppi and Jukka also made an appearance in one episode of Ridiculousness in 2014.

Jukka, along with Steve-O from Jackass, both participated in the web series titled Ultimate Expedition in 2018. Jukka served as an executive producer for this series.

Season 1: 2006

Season 2: 2008

Season 3: 2009

Season 4: 2010

The Dudesons in America: 2010

After a multimillion-dollar deal with MTV, a new show called The Dudesons in America was green lit. With a budget of six million dollars, it would consist of the same line-up of all four Dudesons, and was set to be produced by both Johnny Knoxville and Jeff Tremaine. The Dudesons' own production company, Rabbit Films, decided to do the show with the co-operation of Dickhouse. "The Dudesons have balls where there should be brains and I am honored to be doing a show with them," Knoxville says on the Dudesons's official website. However, after the episode Cowboys & Findians, MTV changed the time the episode would air due to unknown reasons. The Dudesons stated on their official Facebook page that the show would continue on 16 July 2010 and has since ended.

The first episode was shown on MTV 6 May 2010. The Dudesons in America was first aired on 1 August 2010 in the UK, on MTV Bang.

Season 5: 2016

The Dudesons Movie

The international launch of the Dudesons TV-series was supported by the full-length feature film The Dudesons Movie, which was released theatrically in Finland on 31 March 2005, and straight to DVD in a dozen other countries. It was released in the US on 11 July 2006 by Warner Rhino. Despite mixed reviews from Finnish mainstream critics, the film won the "Audience's Favorite Movie" at Jussi Awards, the Finnish equivalent of Oscars, with about 47% of votes. It features guest appearances from Steve-O, Bam Margera, Ryan Dunn, Raab Himself, Phil Margera, April Margera, and Don Vito.

Duudsonit tuli taloon 
Filming the show The Dudesons in America was an exhausting experience for the Dudesons and they wanted to take the group to a new direction after it. They created the show Duudsonit tuli taloon, in which they helped families with their problems.

Dudesons Do Gumball

In 2013, the Dudesons filmed and launched their own three-part series when taking part in the Gumball 3000 event. The show aired exclusively on Extreme Sports Channel, and followed the Finns as they travelled from Copenhagen, Denmark to Monaco. This year they had a Cadillac SUV which had the look of a blue elephant. During the race through Europe they had their "Wheel of Fortune", which was used for different types of pranks.

Guest stars include; Gumball 3000 founder Maximillion Cooper, rappers Xzibit, Eve, Bun B, and Elastinen, actor David Hasselhoff, pro freeskier Jon Olsson, Lee Dainton from Dirty Sanchez, MMA fighter and bodybuilder Robert Burneika, TV personality Dex Carrington, and pro skater Tony Hawk.

Duudsonit: Päällikkö 
In 2019 The Dudesons hosted the television show Duudsonit: Päällikkö, in which a group of contestants competed in challenges.

See also

Jackass
Dirty Sanchez
Nitro Circus

References

External links

The Dudesons' production on IMDb:

Extreme Duudsonit (The Dudesons) Official Website in Finnish

2001 Finnish television series debuts
2000s Finnish television series
2010s Finnish television series
Finnish television sketch shows
Finnish reality television series
Finnish stunt performers
Finnish expatriates in the United States
Channel V Australia original programming
Finnish male comedians
Nelonen original programming
Groups of entertainers
Stunt television series